The 2020 Washington gubernatorial election was held on November 3, 2020. It followed a top-two primary held on August 4. Incumbent governor Jay Inslee, the Democratic candidate, defeated Loren Culp, the Republican candidate by a wide margin. Inslee, who was eligible to run for a third term due to the lack of gubernatorial term limits,  initially launched a campaign for President of the United States in the 2020 election. When he dropped out of that race in August 2019 due to extremely low polling numbers, he announced he would seek a third term as governor. Several other Democratic political figures considered entering the race if Inslee did not run, including Washington Attorney General Bob Ferguson; no other major Democratic candidates entered the race. Republican Loren Culp, the police chief of Republic, Washington, placed second in the top-two primary and advanced to the general election alongside Inslee.

The election was clear and decisive, with incumbent Jay Inslee winning re-election over Loren Culp by over 13 points. This marked the largest margin of victory in a Washington gubernatorial race since Gary Locke won reelection in 2000. Inslee's landslide victory included over 74% of the vote in King County, the highest ever for a Democrat in the county's history. King County, home to Seattle, has about a third of the state's voters. In addition, this was the first time since 2000 that a Democrat won a county in Eastern Washington with Inslee winning Whitman County. Culp still ran ahead of the top-ticket presidential candidate, Donald Trump, by about 4 points.

Despite the margin of victory, Culp refused to concede and filed a lawsuit against Republican Washington Secretary of State Kim Wyman five weeks after the election. He did not give a concession speech, while making claims of irregularities which Wyman characterized as "unsubstantiated". Culp's actions drew criticism and were compared to Donald Trump's refusal to concede the 2020 U.S. presidential election.

Background
Washington has not had a Republican governor since John Spellman left office in 1985, the longest streak of Democratic leadership of any state in the country and the third longest streak of one-party leadership after South Dakota (which has not had a Democratic governor since Harvey L. Wollman left office in 1979) and Utah (which has not had a Democratic governor since Scott M. Matheson left office nine days prior to Spellman in 1985). Incumbent Governor Jay Inslee, who previously served in the U.S. House, was first elected to the governorship in the 2012 election and won reelection in 2016.

When Inslee announced his candidacy for president, several political figures expressed interest in running for Governor if Inslee won the Democratic primaries. These included Attorney General Bob Ferguson, Commissioner of Public Lands Hilary Franz and King County executive Dow Constantine. They stated they would only run if Inslee was not, avoiding a primary challenge.

Several Republican politicians announced their own campaigns to challenge Inslee, including businessman Anton Sakharov, Republic police chief Loren Culp, and state senator Phil Fortunato. However, speculated candidates such as former U.S. Representative Dave Reichert, former Seattle Port Commissioner and 2016 gubernatorial nominee Bill Bryant, Pierce County Executive and former state senator Bruce Dammeier, and state House Minority Leader J. T. Wilcox all declined to be candidates, leaving no prominent Republicans to challenge Inslee, which was seen as a necessary prerequisite to mount a formidable challenge to him.

Primary election 
Washington is one of few states that holds a top-two primary, meaning that all candidates are listed on the same ballot regardless of party affiliation, and the top two move on to the general election. Most states have party primaries.

Democratic candidates

Advanced to the general election 
Jay Inslee, incumbent Governor of Washington and candidate for President of the United States in 2020

Declined 
Dow Constantine, King County Executive
Bob Ferguson, Washington Attorney General (running for reelection)
Hilary Franz, Washington Commissioner of Public Lands (running for reelection)

Republican candidates

Advanced to the general election 
Loren Culp, police chief of Republic, U.S. Army veteran

Eliminated in the primary 
Tim Eyman, activist, initiative promoter
Phil Fortunato, state senator
Joshua Freed, former mayor of Bothell
Raul Garcia, emergency room physician
Nate Herzog, former Lake Forest Park city councilman
Anton Sakharov, program manager

Declined 
Bill Bryant, former Seattle Port Commissioner and nominee for Governor of Washington in 2016
Bruce Dammeier, Pierce County Executive (running for reelection)
Doug Ericksen, state senator
Drew MacEwen, state representative (running for reelection)
Dori Monson, radio personality
Dave Reichert, former U.S. Representative for Washington's 8th congressional district
Drew Stokesbary, state representative (running for reelection)
J. T. Wilcox, minority leader of the Washington House of Representatives (running for reelection)

Green Party

Eliminated in the primary
Liz Hallock, attorney

Independents

Eliminated in the primary
Cregan Newhouse, City of Seattle Consumer Protection Division acting manager and former public television director

Withdrew
Asa Palagi, U.S. Army officer and businessman

Polling

with Bryant, Constantine, Ferguson, and Franz

Results

General election

Debates
Complete video of debate, October 7, 2020 - C-SPAN

Predictions

Endorsements

Polling

Jay Inslee vs. Tim Eyman

Jay Inslee vs. Phil Fortunato

Jay Inslee vs. Joshua Freed

Jay Inslee vs. Raul Garcia

Results

Results by county

Counties that flipped from Republican to Democratic 
Clark (largest city: Vancouver)
Skagit (largest city: Mount Vernon)
Whitman (largest city: Pullman)

Results by congressional district 
Inslee won 6 of 10 congressional districts with the remaining 4 going to Culp, including one that elected a Democrat.

Notes

References

External links
 
 
  (State affiliate of the U.S. League of Women Voters)
 

Official campaign websites
 Loren Culp (R) for Governor
 Jay Inslee (D) for Governor

Washington
Jay Inslee
2020
Gubernatorial